Jennifer Roy (born May 26) is an American children's writer. She is best known for fiction including Yellow Star, which won a  Boston Globe-Horn Book Honor Award (2006), Sydney Taylor Honor Award, The William Allen White Children's Book Award (2009), a New York Public L Book, an ALA Notable Book, National Jewish Book Honor Award, and received starred reviews in Publishers Weekly, School Library Journal, VOYA and Booklist. She has written 35 educational books for children ages 5–16, including the "You Can Write" series.

Her latest book is Playing Atari with Saddam Hussein (February 2018), inspired by the true story of a young boy growing up in Iraq under the first Gulf war. Her Co-author Ali Fadhil was that boy and he grew up to be a translator in the trial of Saddam Hussein.

Her first illustrated book is "Jars of Hope", (August 2015). She is also the coauthor of the Trading Faces series  (Simon and Schuster), a series co-written with her twin sister, Julia DeVillers. The second book in the series is Take Two,  the third book is    Times Squared, and the fourth is "Double Feature". The fifth book in the series is "Triple Trouble". Her book MindBlind, about a boy who is profoundly gifted and has Asperger syndrome, was published in October 2010 and received a YALSA award.

Personal life 

Roy lives in upstate New York with her son.
She is also noted in World Almanac 2008.

Books 

 Yellow Star
 Mindblind
 Cordially Uninvited, series
 Trading Faces, series co-written with Julia DeVillers
 Playing Atari with Saddam Hussein

External links 

 
 

1967 births
Living people
American children's writers
State University of New York at Oswego alumni
Writers from Columbus, Ohio
People from New Albany, Ohio
American twins
Place of birth missing (living people)
American women children's writers
21st-century American women